The Solothurner Literaturpreis is a literary award for a literary achievement by a German language writer.

Awarded since 1994, the annual prize is 15,000 Swiss francs. It is named after the city of Solothurn in Switzerland.

Winners

1994: Monika Maron
1995: Wilhelm Genazino
1996: Klaus Merz
1997: Christoph Ransmayr
1998: Thomas Hürlimann
1999: Birgit Vanderbeke
2000: Christoph Hein
2001: Anna Mitgutsch
2002: Erich Hackl
2003: Hanna Johansen
2004: Barbara Honigmann
2005: Kathrin Röggla
2006: Matthias Zschokke
2007: 
2008: Jenny Erpenbeck
2009: Juli Zeh
2010: Ulrike Draesner
2011: Peter Bichsel
2012: Annette Pehnt
2013: Franz Hohler
2014: Lukas Bärfuss
2015: Thomas Hettche
2016: 
2017: Terézia Mora
2018: Peter Stamm
2019: Karen Duve
2020: Monika Helfer
2021: 
 2022: not awarded

See also
 German literature
 List of literary awards
 List of poetry awards
 List of years in literature
 List of years in poetry

References

External links

Swiss literary awards
Canton of Solothurn
Awards established in 1994
1994 establishments in Switzerland